William Douglas Cullen, Baron Cullen of Whitekirk,  (born 18 November 1935) is a former senior member of the Scottish judiciary. He formerly served as Lord Justice General and Lord President of the Court of Session, and was an additional Lord of Appeal in the House of Lords prior to the transfer of its judicial functions to the Supreme Court.

Early life
William Douglas Cullen was educated at the High School of Dundee and the universities of St Andrews and Edinburgh. He was admitted to the Faculty of Advocates in 1962 and was Standing Junior Counsel to Her Majesty's Customs and Excise from 1970 to 1973. He was appointed Queen's Counsel in 1973 and served as an Advocate Depute from 1978 to 1981. From 1984 to 1986 Cullen served as Chairperson of the influential Edinburgh conservationist group the Cockburn Association.

Judicial career
Lord Cullen was a chairman of the Medical Appeal Tribunals from 1977 until his appointment as a judge in 1985. He was appointed a Senator of the College of Justice, a judge of the High Court of Justiciary and Court of Session, as Lord Cullen. From 1988 to 1990 he conducted the Public Inquiry into the Piper Alpha disaster and in 1996 he chaired the Public Inquiry into the shootings at Dunblane Primary School. In October 1999 he was appointed to chair the Ladbroke Grove Rail Inquiry. He was Lord Justice Clerk and president of the Second Division of the Inner House from 1997 to 2002, when he was appointed Lord Justice General and Lord President of the Court of Session.

In March 2002, Lord Cullen led the 5-judge tribunal at the Scottish Court in the Netherlands which heard the failed appeal of Abdelbaset al-Megrahi against his conviction for the 1988 Lockerbie bombing of Pan Am Flight 103.

On 15 July 2005, Lord Cullen announced his intention to retire in November 2005. On 24 November the Scottish Executive announced that Arthur Hamilton, Lord Hamilton, a member of the Inner House of the Court of Session, would succeed him as the new Lord Justice General and Lord President of the Court of Session.

Honours
On 17 June 2003, Cullen was created a life peer, as Baron Cullen of Whitekirk, of Whitekirk in East Lothian. He sat as a crossbench member of the House of Lords until his retirement in 2019. He was also one of five additional Lords of Appeal in the House of Lords. On 25 June 2005, he was elected president of the Saltire Society, replacing The Right Honourable The Lord Sutherland of Houndwood, K.T. On 30 November 2007 it was announced that Lord Cullen would be appointed a Knight of the Thistle. He was knighted by Queen Elizabeth II at a ceremony in Edinburgh on 2 July 2008. On 4 September 2009 he was also formally installed as chancellor of Abertay University in Dundee, a position he held for a decade. 
In 1995, he was appointed an Honorary Fellow of the Royal Academy of Engineering

Cullen also received an Honorary Doctorate from Heriot-Watt University in 1995 

He was sworn in as a Member of the Privy Council of the United Kingdom in 1997.

References

External links
Lord Cullen reads the verdict in the Lockerbie appeal, 14 March 2002 (RealVideo clip)

1937 births
Living people
Cullen, William Douglas
Crossbench life peers
Knights of the Thistle
Cullen, William, Lord President
Cullen, William Douglas
Lords President of the Court of Session
Lords Justice-General
Fellows of the Royal Society of Edinburgh
Alumni of the University of St Andrews
Alumni of the University of Edinburgh
People from Dundee
Scottish people of Irish descent
Members of the Faculty of Advocates
Scottish King's Counsel
People associated with the University of Abertay Dundee
Place of birth missing (living people)
Fellows of the Royal Academy of Engineering
Life peers created by Elizabeth II